Edgbaston House was a highrise commercial building in Duchess Place, Birmingham. It was built by Laing Development Co Ltd. and the consulting engineers were Ove Arup. Construction cost £1,720,000. It was the result of work by Calthorpe Estates to attract businesses to the Hagley Road and Five Ways by promoting the construction of office blocks there. It is part of the Duchess Place estate which consists of office blocks totalling . They are owned by the Kenmore Group, who acquired the estate from Chelsfield. Tenants of the building include Al Rayan Bank and various medical groups. It was demolished in 2018.

See also
 List of tallest buildings and structures in Birmingham

External links
Emporis entry

Buildings and structures in Birmingham, West Midlands
Office buildings completed in 1976
Buildings and structures demolished in 2018
Demolished buildings and structures in the West Midlands (county)
1976 establishments in England
2018 disestablishments in England